Matías Alfredo Martínez (born 24 March 1988 in Resistencia) is an Argentine football defender who plays for Atlético de Rafaela.

Career
Martínez began his professional playing career with Racing Club de Avellaneda in 2007. He made his first league appearance on 8 December 2007 in a 1-0 home win against Colón in the Primera División.

During the Clausura 2009 tournament he scored 4 goals in 15 games, an impressive return for a defender.

During the summer of 2012, Martinez joined Serie A club Siena on a season-long loan.

During the summer of 2013 joined club Argentinos Juniors on a season-long loan.

Honours
Lanús
Copa Sudamericana: 2013

References

External links
 
 BDFA profile 
 Argentine Primera statistics at Futbol XXI  
 

1988 births
Living people
People from Resistencia, Chaco
Argentine footballers
Argentine expatriate footballers
Association football defenders
Argentine Primera División players
Racing Club de Avellaneda footballers
Club Atlético Lanús footballers
Argentinos Juniors footballers
A.C.N. Siena 1904 players
Sporting Cristal footballers
Expatriate footballers in Italy
Sportspeople from Chaco Province